The Kingdom of the Blind is a Big Finish Productions audio drama featuring Lisa Bowerman as Bernice Summerfield, a character from the spin-off media based on the long-running British science fiction television series Doctor Who.

Plot 
While asleep, Bernice hears a voice in her head which leads her to a strange planet where a race of one-eyed monsters keep a slave race subdued by mutilating them.

Cast
Bernice Summerfield - Lisa Bowerman
Jason Kane - Stephen Fewell
Monoid Voices - Richard Unwin
44 - Paul Clayton
26 - Caroline Morris

Trivia
This story features the Monoids from the Doctor Who serial The Ark.
This story also has a similar name to a short story by H. G. Wells called "The Country of the Blind".

External links
Big Finish Productions - Professor Bernice Summerfield: The Kingdom of the Blind

Bernice Summerfield audio plays
Fiction set in the 27th century